S. Vedachalam is an Indian politician and was a member of the 14th Tamil Nadu Legislative Assembly from the Ambattur constituency. He represented the All India Anna Dravida Munnetra Kazhagam party. At present, he represents Amma Makkal Munnetra Kazhagam

The elections of 2016 resulted in his constituency being won by V. Alexander.

Electoral performance

References 

Tamil Nadu MLAs 2011–2016
All India Anna Dravida Munnetra Kazhagam politicians
Living people
People from Ambattur
1953 births
Amma Makkal Munnetra Kazhagam politicians